Satyrium coriifolium is a species of orchid endemic to the Cape Provinces. It is commonly known as the orange satyre or Ewwa-trewwa in Afrikaans.

Description 
Satyrium coriifolium is brightly coloured, with yellow or orange-red flowers. It is a perennial plant. It flowers from August to November. The flowers are non-resupinate.

Distribution 
Satyrium coriifolium is found in the Cape Floristic Region of the Western Cape and Eastern Cape.

Ecology 
Its bright flowers attract sunbirds, which feed on the nectar and pollinate the flowers.

Conservation status 
Satyrium coriifolium is classified as Least Concern.

References 

coriifolium
Endemic orchids of South Africa